Elisabeth Sabaditsch-Wolff is an Austrian counter-jihad activist. Before she became involved in the counter-jihad movement, she held positions at the Austrian embassies in Kuwait and Libya, and in the Austrian ministry of foreign affairs.

Biography
The daughter of an Austrian diplomat, she says her interest in Islam came after “having been exposed to Islam from early childhood” and being “confronted with life under the Sharia.” She has links to the Wiener Akademikerbund and the Freedom Party of Austria, and manages the homepage of the Netzwerk Karl Martell blog. She is featured extensively on the counter-jihad blog Gates of Vienna, and has been part of a delegation that has worked to "counter Islam" at the Organization for Security and Cooperation in Europe (OSCE).

In 2011 she was convicted by a Viennese court for "disparaging religious doctrines" after having described the Muslim Prophet Muhammad as a pedophile, which was ruled by the European Court of Human Rights in 2018 to not be covered by freedom of speech. According to Bruce Bawer, a search for mentions about the case on the internet, described by William Kilpatrick as a "pivotal event in modern European jurisprudence" that "placed the principles of sharia above the right to freedom of expression", failed to find a single mention of the original appeals verdict in any newspaper in the Western world.

In 2016 Sabaditsch-Wolff was knighted by the Knights of Malta, a Catholic order. She has been active in the Citizens' Movement Pax Europa, the International Civil Liberties Alliance, ACT for America, and has worked with Katie Hopkins. In 2017 she was invited to meet with Kansas Secretary of State Kris Kobach. She has been interviewed regarding her legal case by Jeanine Pirro.

In 2019 she published the book The Truth is No Defense about her legal case. The title comes from being told that telling the truth was no defence since it was "hurtful". The book included "expert analyses" by Robert Spencer, Clare M. Lopez, Stephen Coughlin, Grégor Puppinck, Christian Zeitz, Henrik R. Clausen, Christine Brim and Aaron Rhodes.

References

Living people
Anti-Islam sentiment in Austria
Counter-jihad activists
Critics of Islam
Knights of Malta
People convicted of racial hatred offences
Year of birth missing (living people)